Sale is a city situated in the Gippsland region of the Australian state of Victoria and the council seat of the Shire of Wellington. It had an estimated urban population of 15,682 according to the 2021 census. The total population including the immediate area around the town designated for the future development of Sale currently sits at approximately 19,000 according to shire website.

History
The Aboriginal name for the Sale area is Wayput. Two famous Gippsland explorers, Paul Strzelecki and Angus McMillan, passed through the immediate area around 1840. The first white settler was Archibald McIntosh who arrived in 1844 and established his 'Flooding Creek' property on the flood plain country which was duly inundated soon after his arrival.

In the 1840s, drovers heading south to Port Albert crossed Flooding Creek and were confronted with the difficult marsh country around the Thomson and Latrobe rivers. A punt operated across the Latrobe River until a toll bridge was erected. A Post Office named Flooding Creek opened here on 30 September 1848 being renamed, somewhat belatedly, as Sale on 1 January 1854.

The first town plots went on sale in 1850. When the new settlement was gazetted in 1851 it was named "Sale" – a tribute to General Sir Robert Sale, a British army officer who won fame in the first Afghan war before being killed in battle in India in 1845. An SBS TV documentary, Afghanistan: The Great Game, claims that it is actually named after his wife, Lady Florentia Sale (1790–1853), who wrote a famous journal of her experiences during the First Afghan War which became a best seller in the 1840s and was serialised in The Times (UK) and possibly in Australia. Certainly, her letters to her husband were enthusiastically published in Australian papers.

The town greatly benefitted from the 1851 gold rush at Omeo as it was situated on the Port Albert to Omeo route and was an important base for the goldfields, until the arrival of the railways. It was also an important service centre for East Gippsland and the Monaro Plains of New South Wales. A building boom took place c. 1855–65.

In 1863 the population of Sale reached 1800 and it became a borough. The courthouse opened the following year. Shops, hotels and offices spilled over into Raymond Street and the first Anglican Church was erected on the site now occupied by St Anne's and Gippsland Grammar School. The Gippsland Times newspaper was established in 1861 while the first Star Hotel and the Criterion Hotel were built in 1865.

In late December 1874 a visitor to the township recorded a description of Sale “which has all the appearances of a flourishing township”.  He observed that “the streets are wide and shops plentiful, but fruit is scarce, a few stale cherries being all I could obtain from the principal shop in the place”.

St Paul's Cathedral is the cathedral church of the Anglican Diocese of Gippsland in Australia. The cathedral building, built in 1884, is a double-storey building with a rectangular footprint and is constructed of red brick and slate roofing.

In terms of access, the first reasonable road from Melbourne arrived in 1865 and Cobb and Co established a rough-and-ready 24-hour coach service linking Melbourne and Sale. The Latrobe Wharf was built in the 1870s and two hotels emerged to exploit the new centre of activity. It was located near the present swing bridge although little is left.

Anthony Trollope visited Sale in 1872. Writing of the experience in Australia and New Zealand (1873) he spoke of the town's "innumerable hotels" and concluded from his impressions that the Aborigines had little chance of surviving as a race. The children's author Mary Grant Bruce was born in the town in 1878.

A two-storey post office, with clock tower, was built in 1884 (it was demolished in 1963). HM Prison Sale was completed in 1887 and it operated for 110 years until it was replaced by a private Fulham Correctional Centre. The building has since been demolished, with only part of the large brick fencing still remaining. The site remained empty until 2014 when construction of the new Sale Police Station commenced there. It opened in March 2015.

Other landmarks in the town include Our Lady of Sion Convent and the Criterion Hotel. The former was designed by architects Reed, Smart and Tappin and built 1892–1901. Assembly halls and dormitory rear wing were added in 1938; the residential wing was added in 1953. The building is listed on the Register of the National Estate. The Criterion Hotel was built in 1865. It originally had a two-storey timber verandah, but this was replaced by a cast iron verandah between 1880 and 1900. It is considered "one of the most impressive hostelries in Victoria" and is listed on the Register of the National Estate. The Criterion Hotel closed in 2006 and its rapidly deteriorating condition caused local concern that it would be demolished. However, the site was subsequently purchased by a Traralgon-based developer who had previous expertise in restoration of commercial buildings. The Criterion received a complete rebuild in 2010/11 with the external heritage facade and verandah fully restored. It re-opened as a hotel, function venue and restaurant early in 2013.

With the growth of shipping on the local waterways and the Gippsland Lakes (and the establishment of a railhead at Sale in 1879) schemes emerged to develop Sale as a port. The construction of the Sale Canal (complete with turning circle) duly commenced in the 1880s, thereby linking the town via the Thomson River and the Gippsland Lakes to the open sea. It was completed in 1890. Other elements were the Sale Swing Bridge, completed in 1883, a high wharf, and a launching ramp which still exists in the heart of the city. However, neither the bridge nor the canal created the desired surge of trade and the depression of the 1890s soon engulfed the town. Sale became a town in 1924 and a city in 1950.

In World War II, the West Sale RAAF base was the landing site of 2 Japanese Mitsubishi Zeros.

Sale has seen much development and redevelopment in the past decade, one example being the multimillion-dollar redevelopment of the city's Port of Sale.

Geography

Climate 
Sale has a moderate oceanic climate (Cfb) made up of warm summers, mild autumns and springs and cool winters. Sale records 595.9 mm (23.4 in) of measurable precipitation per year, making it drier than the nearby state capital, Melbourne. The wettest month is November whilst the driest is July. At 54.8 days, it gets more clear days than Melbourne (48 days). The city can be affected by foehn winds originating from the Great Dividing Range.

Economy and infrastructure

Oil and gas

After oil was discovered offshore in 1965, the town experienced a boom period when it became the service and residential base of the Esso-BHP oil and gas exploration and development program. There the hydrocarbons are removed and used to produce LPG and ethane. The gas is piped to Melbourne and the oil to Westernport Bay and thence to Geelong and Altona from where it is shipped interstate and overseas.

Esso's Longford gas plant was the site of a major explosion on 25 September 1998 which killed two employees and crippled the state's gas supplies for a period of two weeks. Previously, Sale was significant as an office centre for the Esso corporation but these operations were relocated around 1990, leaving only a gas processing facility in nearby Longford.

Shopping
Sale's main shopping precincts are Gippsland Centre and adjacent Raymond St Mall. Most other shopping style stores including clothing, music and food can be found along Raymond St, known to be the main street of Sale. Supermarkets in Sale include Coles, Woolworths, Aldi, Foodworks and IGA. Other retailers include Target, Bunnings Warehouse, Harvey Norman, The Reject Shop, Spotlight and Dimmeys.

Facilities
Wellington Library Service

Gippsland Regional Sports Complex (GRSC), owned and operated by Wellington Shire Council, the sports complex is 5 acres in size and caters for a wide variety of sports and recreational activities including basketball, netball, volleyball and hockey to name a few.

Aqua Energy, owned and operated by Wellington Shire Council, Aqua Energy has three heated indoor pools which are open all year round, and also two outdoor pools which are open during the warmer months. The facility is also home to a modern gym with group fitness classes for all ages, cafe, childcare, swim school and personal training

The Wedge performing arts centre is a contemporary hub for performing arts and entertainment complete with theatre, versatile meeting rooms and modern café.

Fulham Correctional Centre, a medium security prison, is in the locality of Fulham to the west of Sale.

A brand new major TAFE campus has also been completed in 2022 close to the CBD ,built on the former old Sale netball courts . It offers tertiary training of apprenticeship trades and other industry training.

Transport

Sale is linked by rail to Melbourne and Bairnsdale by the Bairnsdale V/Line rail service that stops at the local railway station. Until 1983 the station was situated in the centre of town, on what is now the Gippsland Centre shopping centre.

The city is located at the junction of the Princes Highway and the northeastern end of the South Gippsland Highway.

Sale Swing Bridge

The Sale Swing Bridge is the only one left in the world that can swing around 360° and featured in the Australian film noir movie "The Tender Hook".

Media

Newspapers
Sale's local newspaper is The Gippsland Times founded in 1861.  Two issues are published each week; subscribers pay for only one issue per week. Its readership spans Wellington Shire, from north of Dargo to south of Port Albert, and to the west of Rosedale and east of Munro. The paper is part of the Fairfax Rural Media network of newspapers.

Television
The area was the first in Australia to receive its own regional television station, GLV-10 Gippsland (now Southern Cross 10), when it launched on 9 December 1961.

Programs from the three main commercial television networks (Seven, Nine and Ten) are all re-broadcast into Sale by their regional affiliates - Prime7 (AMV), WIN (VTV) and Southern Cross Austereo (GLV). All broadcast from the Latrobe Valley transmitter at Mount Tassie.  All the commercial stations are based in Traralgon and have local commercials placed on their broadcasts.

Local news is available on all three commercial networks:
WIN broadcasts a half-hour WIN News bulletin each weeknight at 5:30pm, produced from studios in Wollongong. 
Southern Cross Austereo and Prime7 broadcast short local news and weather updates throughout the day, produced and broadcast from Prime7's Canberra studios and SCA's Tasmanian studios.
Nine previously produced a local news bulletin branded Nine News Gippsland and later Nine News Local for a brief period between 2017 and 2021 that aired on the Southern Cross Austereo primary channel when it was previously affiliated with Nine.

Both national public broadcasters, ABC (ABC TV) and SBS (SBS TV) are broadcast into the Latrobe Valley as well, via Mount Tassie.

Additional digital multi-channels broadcast by all the networks in addition to the ones listed above are available on the digital service called Freeview to viewers in Sale and the Gippsland/Latrobe Valley region. These channels include HD simulcasts of the primary channel (available on channels 20, 30, 50, 60 and 80). As well as ABC TV Plus, ABC Me, ABC News, SBS Viceland, SBS World Movies, 10 Bold, 10 Peach, 10 Shake, 7two, 7mate, 9Gem, 9Go!, 9Life and Sky News Regional.

Subscription television service Foxtel (previously Austar until 2014) is available via satellite.

Radio
Traralgon based Ace Radio commercial stations — TRFM (99.5 MHz) and Gold 1242 both cover Sale. The Gold 1242 AM 1242 kHz transmitter is located in Myrtlebank between Maffra and Sale.  Most ABC stations are rebroadcast locally as well as the local ABC Gippsland station (100.7 MHz / 828 kHz) that is based in Sale.  Community radio station Life FM (103.9 MHz) is based in Sale.
On 30 May 2009 the ABC's national network Triple J held their annual One Night Stand concert in Sale. 12,000 people attended the event at the Sale Football Ground.

Culture

Events and attractions

The March Labour Day weekend witnesses the Marley Point Overnight Yacht Race which is the longest overnight inland yacht race in the world. It begins near Sale and concludes at Paynesville, some 60 km away.

A Sale attraction is Lake Guthridge, a low lying retention basin, which features a park for children, barbecues, and a walking trail around the lake and car parking facilities. Prior to refurbishment in the mid-1990s Lake Guthridge suffered a blue-green algae problem that resulted in widespread fish mortality until local joggers and nearby residents complained of the associated stench causing council to act. Lake Guthridge has never been used as a food source.

A significantly superior natural waterway of historical significance is the aforementioned Port of Sale (previously Sale Canal), the original inspiration for the early town's original name - Flooding Creek. The Canal connects to other local rivers and lakes, leading eventually to Lakes Entrance, an oceanside tourist resort situated near a managed, naturally occurring channel connecting the Gippsland Lakes to Bass Strait. Once steam boats and ocean-going craft were able to journey from Lakes Entrance to Sale, arriving at the docks at Sale to ferry passengers and goods from Eastern Victoria, although its success in such a role was short lived.

In recent years, a grassroots effort helped to persuade the local council to invest in restoration of the foreshore and to protect against erosion. Prior to the rise of Common Carp as the predominant fish species due to nutrient overload from agricultural runoff, Sale Canal featured pristine waters and native fish stocks. The Sale Regatta is run yearly on a long straight section of the canal headed towards Longford. Visitors to Sale are usually unaware of the Canal, including its restoration, due to roadside views of it being blocked by the former Esso corporation headquarters, half of which is commercially let office space and the other half having been re-developed into a  multimillion-dollar Library and Art Gallery.

Sale is home to the Gippsland Art Gallery, a major Victorian public gallery. The gallery presents a diverse exhibition program of contemporary, modern and historical exhibitions, with a focus on the landscape of South Eastern Australia. The gallery holds a collection of nearly 1,000 artworks, with a small selection on permanent view.

A fishing contest is held at Lake Guthridge every Easter and the Sale Music Festival at Gippsland Grammar School in June. The Sale Art Exhibition is held over August and September, while the Sale show falls in October.

As a tribute to the late King George V, an elm-lined section of the Princes Highway is named King George V Avenue.

On 30 May 2009, Sale hosted Triple J's One Night Stand at the Sale Football Ground.  Sale also has a strong underground music scene; events are held every few months and attract scores of young people. 

The John Leslie Theatre (The Wedge) is the primary place to view live theatre, ballet and music, but also host conferences and presentations. Large events like the local Carols by Candlelight or Shakespearean performances are often performed outdoors at Fauna Park.

Every Saturday, Sunday, and Monday, the Gippsland Armed Forces Museum is open, featuring local military and significant history and artifacts. In recent times it has moved from its original location on Punt Lane to a bigger building at West Sale Airfield, after the original building was purchased for development works. The museum pays homage to the 13th Australian Light Horse Regiment, among others.

Sports
Australian rules football, basketball and cricket are the most popular sports in Sale. The Gippsland Regional Sports Complex hosts many other sports including basketball, Association rules football, volleyball, badminton, table tennis, indoor soccer, aerobics, group fitness and gym.

The city has two Australian rules football teams, Sale, competing in the Gippsland Football League and Sale City, who compete in the North Gippsland Football League.

It is home to the Sale Sonics, a representative basketball team that competes in the Country Basketball League and is renowned for developing many elite Australian rules football and National Basketball League sporting stars including Billy Hughes, Jason Gram, Scott Pendlebury, Dylan McLaren and Rhys Carter .

Sale United Football Club enters teams in the Gippsland Soccer League (GSL) competitions. Sale United FC was formed as the Sale City Soccer Club in 1974. It has remained in the Gippsland competition each year since the Club's first season and has had a number of promotions and relegations during the term. Sale United is the only recognised soccer club in the Shire, but this was always the case. Representative clubs from Yarram, Bundalaguah, and the RAAF East Sale base also competed in the GSL.

The city is the home to two field hockey clubs in the East Gippsland Hockey Association. The Sale Hockey Club fields teams in juniors mixed under 13s, under 15s, and under 18s along with two women's teams, the Sale Cygnets and the Sale Swans, along with one open team. The under 18s and open teams were champions in the 2008 season.  The Wurruk Greyhounds are the Sale district's second hockey team, located in the satellite town Wurruk.

Sale has a horse racing club, the Sale Turf Club, which schedules around 21 race meetings a year including the Sale Cup meeting in October.

The Sale Greyhound Racing Club holds regular greyhound racing meetings at the Sale Showgrounds. The Showgrounds hosted the first meeting on 6 February 1936 with newer tracks built in 1963 and 1982.

Golfers play at the course of the Sale Golf Club on Longford-Rosedale Road in neighbouring Longford.

Sale is also home to a baseball club whose baseball diamonds are located at Stephenson Park.
There are both junior and senior teams competing in the Latrobe Valley Baseball Association.

Sale is also home to the Sale City Rollers who are the region's first amateur Co-ed flat track roller derby league and are located at the Henebery Pavilion at the Sale Showgrounds.

Notable people

Arts
 Mary Grant Bruce, Children's Author 
 Henrietta Maria Gulliver, Artist, florist and landscape designer 
 Laura Jean McKay, author
 Annemieke Mein, Dutch-born Australian textile artist
 Danny Spencer, Musician

Sport
 Shane Birss, former Australian rules footballer with St Kilda Football Club and Western Bulldogs
 Travis Birt, cricketer for Tasmania and Australia 
 Rhys Carter, basketballer
 Ashley Delaney, Olympic swimmer 
 Rob Foster, former Australian rules footballer with the Melbourne Football Club
 Pauline Frasca, Olympic rower
 Jason Gram, former Australian rules footballer with the St Kilda Football Club 
 Dylan McLaren, former Australian rules footballer with the Brisbane Lions and the Carlton Football Club
 Alan Morrow, former Australian rules footballer with St Kilda Football Club and 1966 premiership winning player 
 Scott Pendlebury, Australian rules footballer with the Collingwood Football Club
 Norman Ware, former Australian rules footballer with the Footscray Football Club, Brownlow medalist, captain and team of the century

Politics
 Kevin Andrews, Liberal politician
 Darren Chester, Federal Member for Gippsland (National Party)
 Neil McInnes, State Member for Gippsland South 1973–1982, (National Party), (Liberal Party)
 Peter Ryan, former leader of the  Nationals

TV
 Wil Anderson, comedian
 Mark Howard, commentator

See also
 RAAF Base East Sale

References

 
Cities in Victoria (Australia)
1851 establishments in Australia
Towns in Victoria (Australia)
Shire of Wellington